Bulbophyllum sect. Hirtula is a section of the genus Bulbophyllum.

Description
Species in this section are creeping rhizomatic epiphytes with 4 pollina.

Distribution
Plants from this section are found in Nepal, Bhutan, NE. India, Myanmar, South China, Thailand, Peninsular Malaysia, Sumatra, Java,
Borneo, Sulawesi, Philippines, New Guinea.

Species
Bulbophyllum section  Hirtula comprises the following species:

References

Orchid subgenera